Kim Jong-gil (Hangul: 김종길; November 5, 1926 – April 1, 2017) was an early-modern South Korean poet.

Life
Kim Jong-gil was born on November 5, 1926 in Andong, Gyeongsangbuk-do, Korea. and graduated from Korea University with undergraduate and graduate degrees in English Literature. He also conducted research in English Literature at Sheffield University. Kim has worked as a professor at several universities including Chonggu University, Gyeongbuk University and Korea University. He died on April 1, 2017.

Work

Kim Jong-gil's poetics are exemplified by a concentrated focus on maintaining clarity and lucidity, and by his skillful exploration of the power of the poetic image. The idea of imagery possessed for the poet a near transcendental value, which he believed could enable both poet and reader alike to attain a greater understanding of truth. His poetic methodology can be thus understood only in the context of his attitude towards life which functioned through the medium of clear, concrete images.

Kim's work successfully incorporated ideas heralded from Imagism, a modern poetic tradition espoused by poets such as Amy Lowell, HD, and Ezra Pound, and the traditional style of hansi and the spirit of Seonbi. But unlike other imagist poetry of the time, Kim's works exude a classical or traditional elegance, which in turn endows the work with a sense of integrity and completion. This traditional elegance is most visible in the poet's emotional restraint and his detachment from the external world. In addition to this emotional restraint, the poet also focuses on the virtue of decency, as an effective means of conveying sorrow. In “Marking” (Chaejeom), for example, the poet silently marks the paper of a student who has just died, and enters the grade in his report card. This unspoken sorrow and contemplation of death ultimately leads to a more understated and more powerful impact on the reader. Thus the most fundamental and important characteristic of Kim's poetry is in its extensive insight into life and the depth of the mind, through the cultivation of restraint, decency, and imagination.

Kim won the 2007 Cheong Ma Literature Award, the 2005 Lee Yuksa Poetry Award, and the 2005 Ko San Literature Award.

Works in translation
Spanish
 Ya queda poca luz del dia (김종길 시선)
German
 Nachtkerze (달맞이꽃)

Works in Korean (partial)
Poetry Collections 
 Seongtanje
 Hahoe-eseo
 Hwangsa hyeonsang
Literary Criticism
 Siron
 Jinsil gwa eoneo
 Hanguksiui wisang.

Awards
2005 Ko San Literature Award
2005 Lee Yuksa Poetry Award
2007 Cheong Ma Literature Award

References 

1926 births
2017 deaths
Korean writers